Buck Pike is a fell located in the Lake District National Park in Cumbria. Buck Pike is near the village of Coniston. Other fells in this area include Brown Pike, Dow Crag, and the Old Man of Coniston.

Fells of the Lake District